Beatrix (Beatrix Wilhelmina Armgard, ; born 31 January 1938) is a member of the Dutch royal house who reigned as Queen of the Netherlands from 1980 until her abdication in 2013.

Beatrix is the eldest daughter of Queen Juliana and her husband, Prince Bernhard of Lippe-Biesterfeld. Upon her mother's accession in 1948, she became heir presumptive. Beatrix attended a public primary school in Canada during World War II, and then finished her primary and secondary education in the Netherlands in the post-war period. In 1961, she received her law degree from Leiden University. In 1966, Beatrix married Claus von Amsberg, a German diplomat, with whom she had three children. When her mother abdicated on 30 April 1980, Beatrix succeeded her as queen.

Beatrix's reign saw the country's Caribbean possessions reshaped with Aruba's secession and becoming its own constituent country within the kingdom in 1986. This was followed by the dissolution of the Netherlands Antilles in 2010, which created the new special municipalities of Bonaire, Sint Eustatius, and Saba, and the two new constituent countries of Curaçao and Sint Maarten.

On Koninginnedag (Queen's Day), 30 April 2013, Beatrix abdicated in favour of her eldest son, Willem-Alexander. At the time of her abdication at age 75, Beatrix was the oldest reigning monarch in the country's history.

Early life
Beatrix Wilhelmina Armgard was born on 31 January 1938 at Soestdijk Palace in Baarn, Netherlands, as the first child of Princess Juliana and Prince Bernhard of Lippe-Biesterfeld. Beatrix was baptised on 12 May 1938 in the Great Church in The Hague. Her five godparents were King Leopold III of Belgium; Princess Alice, Countess of Athlone; Elisabeth, Princess of Erbach-Schönberg; Duke Adolf Friedrich of Mecklenburg; and Countess Allene de Kotzebue. Beatrix's middle names are the first names of her maternal grandmother (the then reigning Queen Wilhelmina) and her paternal grandmother (Princess Armgard of Sierstorpff-Cramm).

When Beatrix was one year old, in 1939, her younger sister Princess Irene was born.

World War II broke out in the Netherlands on 10 May 1940 (Westfeldzug). On 13 May, the Dutch Royal Family evacuated to London, United Kingdom. One month later, Beatrix went to Ottawa, Ontario, Canada, with her mother Juliana and her sister Irene, while her father Bernhard and maternal grandmother Queen Wilhelmina remained in London. The family lived at the Stornoway residence (now the residence of the Leader of the Opposition in the Parliament of Canada). With bodyguards and ladies in waiting, the family summered at Bigwin Inn on Lake of Bays, Ontario where four private stone cottages of the resort served as their retreat. While on Bigwin Island, the constitution of the Netherlands was stored in the safe of Bigwin Inn's rotunda building. Princess Juliana and her family were remembered for their "down to earth" friendliness, general gratefulness and great reverence for their homeland and people, to whom they paid homage by refraining from all luxuries offered to guests at the resort that was once billed as the largest and most luxurious summer resort in Canada. To provide them with a greater sense of security, culinary chefs and staff catered to personal orders at meal time. Upon their departure, the hotel musicians of the Bigwin Inn Orchestra assembled dockside; and at every public performance afterward through to the end of World War II, the Wilhelmus was played. In the years following the shuttering and neglect of the island resort, the "Juliana" cottages were well maintained and preserved in an informal tribute to Princess Juliana and her family. In thanks for the protection of her and her daughters, Princess Juliana established the custom of the delivery to the Canadian government every spring of tulips, which are the centrepiece of the Canadian Tulip Festival.

The second sister of Beatrix, Princess Margriet, was born in Ottawa in 1943. During their exile in Canada, Beatrix attended nursery and Rockcliffe Park Public School, a primary school where she was known as "Trixie Orange".

On 5 May 1945, the German troops in the Netherlands surrendered. The family returned to the Netherlands on 2 August 1945. Beatrix went to the progressive primary school De Werkplaats in Bilthoven run by pacifist social reformers Kees Boeke and Beatrice Boeke-Cadbury. Her third sister Princess Christina was born in 1947. On 6 September 1948, her mother succeeded her grandmother Wilhelmina as Queen of the Netherlands, and as there was no male issue for queen Juliana and prince Bernhard, Beatrix became the heir presumptive to the Dutch throne at the age of ten.

Education

In April 1950, Princess Beatrix entered the Incrementum, a part of Baarnsch Lyceum, where, in 1956, she passed her school graduation examinations in the subjects of arts and classics. Her tutor from April 1951 was Gertrude Büringh Boekhoudt, who remained a close confidant until Miss B.B.'s death in 1982.

In 1954, Beatrix served as bridesmaid at the wedding of Baroness van Randwijck and Mr T Boey.

On 31 January 1956 Beatrix celebrated her 18th birthday. From that date, under the Constitution of the Netherlands, she was entitled to assume the Royal Prerogative.  At that time, her mother installed her in the Council of State.

The same year her studies at Leiden University began. In her first years at the university, she studied sociology, jurisprudence, economics, parliamentary history and constitutional law. In the course of her studies she also attended lectures on the cultures of Suriname and the Netherlands Antilles, the Charter for the Kingdom of the Netherlands, international affairs, international law, history and European law.

The princess also visited various European and international organisations in Geneva, Strasbourg, Paris, and Brussels.  She was also an active member of the VVSL (Female Union for Students in Leiden), now called L.S.V. Minerva, after merging with the Leidsch Studenten Corps (which before then was male-only). In the summer of 1959, she passed her preliminary examination in law, and she obtained her law degree in July 1961.

Political involvement

In 1965, Beatrix became engaged to the German aristocrat Claus von Amsberg, a diplomat working for the German Foreign Office. There was a massive protest on their wedding day in Amsterdam on 10 March 1966. Prince Claus had served in the Hitler Youth and the Wehrmacht and therefore was easily associated with German Nazism. Protests included slogans like "Claus 'raus!" (Claus out!) and "Mijn fiets terug" ("Return my bicycle" – a reference to German soldiers confiscating Dutch bicycles during WWII). A group of Provos threw a smoke bomb at the Golden Coach, resulting in a street battle with the police.

As time went on, Prince Claus became one of the most popular members of the Dutch monarchy, and his death in 2002 was widely mourned.

On 25 November 1975, Beatrix and Prince Claus attended the independence ceremony of Suriname, held in the new nation's capital, Paramaribo, representing her mother the Queen.

As a monarch, Beatrix had weekly meetings with the prime minister. She signed all new Acts of Parliament and royal decrees, and until a constitutional change late in her reign, appointed the informateur, an official who is responsible for chairing coalition talks in the formation of new governments. At the state opening of parliament each September, she made a Speech from the Throne, in which the government announced its plans for the coming parliamentary year. As Queen, she was president of the Council of State. Her role was largely ceremonial and as a focus of national unity, she did not make legislative or executive decisions.

Beatrix is a member of the Bilderberg Group.

Marriage and children

Engagement to Claus
On 28 June 1965, the engagement of Princess Beatrix to the German diplomat Claus von Amsberg was announced. Claus and Beatrix had met at the wedding-eve party of Princess Tatjana of Sayn-Wittgenstein-Berleburg and Moritz, Landgrave of Hesse, in summer 1964. After Parliament consented to the marriage, Claus von Amsberg became a Dutch citizen, and upon his marriage became Prince Claus of the Netherlands, Jonkheer van Amsberg.

Wedding, 1966

Beatrix married Claus von Amsberg on 10 March 1966 in civil and religious ceremonies. The bride wore a traditional gown with train in duchesse silk satin, designed by Caroline Bergé-Farwick of Maison Linette, in Den Bosch, and the Württemberg Ornate Pearl Tiara. The senior bridesmaids were the bride's youngest sister, Princess Christina of the Netherlands; Princess Christina of Sweden; Lady Elizabeth Anson; Joanna Roëll; Eugénie Loudon; and the bridegroom's sister, Christina von Amsberg. The junior bridesmaids were Daphne Stewart-Clark and Carolijn Alting von Geusau, with page boys Joachim Jencquel and Markus von Oeynhausen-Sierstorpff.

The royal couple travelled to the ceremony together in the gold state carriage. The civil ceremony was conducted by the Mayor of Amsterdam, Gijsbert van Hall, at Amsterdam City Hall. The marriage blessing took place in the Westerkerk, conducted by the Rev. Hendrik Jan Kater, with a sermon by the Rev. Johannes Hendrik Sillevis Smitt.

Children

The royal couple had three sons:

They lived at Drakensteyn Castle in Lage Vuursche with their children until Beatrix ascended the throne. In 1981, they moved into Huis ten Bosch Palace in The Hague.

Reign

From the 1970s, Beatrix began to prepare more intensively for her future position as head of state. She made many trips abroad with Prince Claus, including a controversial one to the Soviet Union.

After the Lockheed affair, Beatrix and Claus began to delve into the royal household and made plans to adapt it. In addition, they asked advisers to prepare for Beatrix's reign. On 31 January 1980, the birthday of her eldest daughter and heir presumptive, Queen Juliana announced during a live television speech that she wished to abdicate on 30 April in favor of her daughter Beatrix.

That Beatrix would succeed her mother as queen was not a matter of course when she was born. It was not until 1983 that the Constitution was amended in such a way that the eldest child of the head of state becomes the legal heir to the throne. Until then, it had been arranged that the eldest son always had priority over a daughter. Only after Juliana was biologically unable to have more children, Beatrix was certain that she was the intended successor.

On 30 April 1980, Beatrix became the monarch when her mother abdicated. She was sworn in and inaugurated as monarch during a joint session of the two chambers of the States General at a ceremony held in the Nieuwe Kerk in Amsterdam later that day.

Beatrix's constitutional duties included those typically accorded to a head of state; this includes having to sign every piece of legislation before it becomes law, formally appointing various officials, receiving and accrediting ambassadors, and awarding honours and medals, among others. Outside of these constitutional duties, her other informal roles included being the highest representative of the kingdom internationally and to be a unifying figure locally.

Beatrix was rarely quoted directly in the press during her reign, for the government information service (Rijksvoorlichtingsdienst) made it a condition of interviews that she should not be quoted. This policy was introduced shortly after her inauguration, reportedly to protect her from political complications that might arise from "off-the-cuff" remarks. It did not apply to her son Prince Willem-Alexander.

Throughout much of her reign, Beatrix had a considerable role in the cabinet formation process; notably she appointed the informateur, the person who leads the negotiations that ultimately lead to the formation of a government. However, this was changed in 2012, and now the largest party in the States General appoints a "scout" who then appoints an informateur.

On 1 January 1986, Aruba seceded from the Netherlands Antilles and became a separate constituent country in the Dutch Kingdom.

On 6 October 2002, the Queen's husband, Prince Claus, died after a long illness. A year and a half later her mother died after long suffering from senile dementia, while her father succumbed to cancer in December 2004.

On 8 February 2005, Beatrix received a rare honorary doctorate from Leiden University, an honour the Queen does not usually accept. In her acceptance speech she reflected on the monarchy and her own 25 years as Queen. The speech was broadcast live.

On 29 and 30 April 2005, she celebrated the 25th anniversary of her reign.  She was interviewed on Dutch television, was offered a concert on Dam Square in Amsterdam, and a celebration took place in The Hague, the country's seat of government.

On 31 May 2006 the 6th Polish Air Assault Brigade would receive the Militaire Willemsorde der 4e klasse in The Hague. Beatrix was to tie the prestigious medal to the standard of the incumbents of the 1st Independent Polish Parachute Brigade.

On 10 October 2010, the Netherlands Antilles were formally dissolved. The new municipalities of Bonaire, Sint Eustatius, and Saba and the new constituent countries of Curaçao and Sint Maarten were established in its place. The dissolution ceremony in the Netherlands Antilles' capital, Willemstad, was attended by the then-Prince and Princess of Orange, Willem-Alexander and his wife Máxima, representing the Queen.

Kissed by a bystander, 1988

During 1988 Queen's Day, Queen Beatrix was kissed by a bystander, later identified as Maarten Rijkers, when she walked through the crowd of people at a flea market in the Jordaan. When Beatrix walked alongside Rijkers he said "Give me a kiss, girl", after which he gave her a hug and two kisses. It received wide media attention and appeared to be a historic moment. An image of this scene was published in large on the front page of De Telegraaf. Even 25 years later in 2013, NRC Handelsblad wrote an article about it and the impact of it.

The reaction of the Queen was seen by people as very positive and was a boost for her reputation in the "Jordaan" region of Amsterdam. The visit was promoted as a "spontaneous visit" to boost her popularity as she wasn't very popular in said region. Historian and Dutch royalty watcher J.G. Kikkert claimed in a lecture that the kiss had been staged, based on what he called "usually very reliable sources". He also noted that although the visit and the kiss might not have been her idea, but that of others, she certainly would have given her approval for she was known to leave no space for coincidence.

Attack on the royal family, 2009

On 30 April 2009, the Queen and other members of the royal family were targeted in a car attack by a man named Karst Tates. Tates crashed his Suzuki Swift into a parade in Apeldoorn, narrowly missing a bus carrying the Queen. Five people were killed instantly and two victims and the assailant Tates died later. Other victims of the crash were critically hurt. One week after the attack, another victim succumbed to the injuries he had sustained. The royal party were unharmed, but the Queen and members of her family saw the crash at close range. Within hours, Beatrix made a rare televised address to express her shock and condolences. The man reportedly told police he was deliberately targeting the royal family.

Abdication, 2013

In a broadcast on national media on 28 January 2013, Beatrix announced her intention to abdicate on 30 April (Queen's Day), when she would have been on the throne for exactly 33 years. Beatrix stated that it was time to "place the responsibility for the country in the hands of a new generation." Her heir apparent was her eldest son, Prince Willem-Alexander. She was the third successive Dutch monarch to abdicate, following her grandmother and her mother. The broadcast was followed by a statement from Prime Minister Mark Rutte who paid tribute to Beatrix, saying "Since her investiture in 1980, she has applied herself heart and soul to Dutch society."

The official programme for the abdication and inauguration took place on 30 April 2013. Beatrix signed the instrument of abdication in the Vroedschapkamer (also known as Mozeszaal) in the Royal Palace, Amsterdam at 10:07 a.m. local time. With the completion of her signature, she was no longer monarch. The inauguration of Willem-Alexander as king took place that afternoon in the Nieuwe Kerk in Amsterdam.

Personal wealth
In 2009, Forbes estimated her wealth at US$300 million.

Post-abdication
Beatrix continues to undertake some royal duties and is patron of many organisations. She lives in the small moated Drakensteyn Castle near the village of Lage Vuursche, and a townhouse near Noordeinde Palace.

Honorific eponyms
Beatrix has given her name to a number of facilities in the Netherlands and beyond. These include:
 Streekziekenhuis Koningin Beatrix, regional hospital in Beatrixpark, Winterswijk.
Queen Beatrix International Airport in Aruba.
 Reina Beatrix School in Aruba.
 Queen Beatrix Hospital Medical Center, Sint Eustatius.
 Queen Beatrix Chair in Dutch Studies at UC Berkeley
 Queen Beatrix Nursing Home, Albion Park Rail, NSW, Australia.

A few parks in the country also bear her name:
 Beatrixpark in the Oud-Zuid neighbourhood in Amsterdam.
 Beatrixpark in Almere.
 Beatrixpark in 's-Hertogenbosch. 
 Beatrixpark in Utrecht. 
 Beatrixpark in Schiedam.

It has been speculated that Beatrix is De Onbekende Beeldhouwer (Unknown Sculptor), whose work has been appearing in Amsterdam since 1983. There has been no confirmation of this.

Titles, styles, honours and arms

31 January 1938 – 30 April 1980: Her Royal Highness Princess Beatrix of the Netherlands, Princess of Orange-Nassau, Princess of Lippe-Biesterfeld
30 April 1980 – 30 April 2013: Her Majesty The Queen of the Netherlands, Princess of Orange-Nassau, Princess of Lippe-Biesterfeld
30 April 2013 – present: Her Royal Highness Princess Beatrix of the Netherlands, Princess of Orange-Nassau, Princess of Lippe-Biesterfeld

Princess Beatrix has held titles throughout her life, as a granddaughter or daughter of a monarch, and eventually as the Sovereign. Beatrix's official title was Her Majesty the Queen of the Netherlands, Princess of Orange-Nassau, etc., etc., etc. The triple etc. refers to the monarch's many dormant titles. She signed official documents with only "Beatrix". In common parlance she was referred to as The Queen (de koningin or de vorstin) or Her Majesty (Hare Majesteit). But when in conversation with the queen the practice was to initially address her as "Your Majesty" or in Dutch as "Uwe Majesteit" and thereafter as "Mevrouw" (ma'am).

Beatrix has received honours and awards from countries around the world, both during her life as a princess and as a monarch. In her capacity as the Sovereign she was Grand Master of the Military Order of William (Militaire Willemsorde) and the other Dutch orders of merit. She is a Stranger Lady of the Most Noble Order of the Garter and the 1,187th Dame of the Order of the Golden Fleece in Spain, and she has received numerous other medals and decorations.

From birth till her inauguration as queen she had the following name and titles, to which she reverted after her abdication: Her Royal Highness Princess Beatrix of the Netherlands, Princess of Orange-Nassau, Princess of Lippe-Biesterfeld.

Arms

Ancestry

Prime Ministers during her reign

References

Books

External links

 of Princess Beatrix
 

|-

1938 births
Dutch monarchs
Dutch people of German descent
Heirs presumptive to the Dutch throne
House of Orange-Nassau
Leiden University alumni
Living people
Members of the Council of State (Netherlands)
Monarchs who abdicated
Protestant Church Christians from the Netherlands
Protestant monarchs
Princesses of Orange-Nassau
Queens regnant in Europe
House of Lippe
Amsberg
20th-century women rulers
Recipients of the Order of the Star of Romania
Articles containing video clips
Extra Ladies of the Order of the Garter